Jazz Concerto Grosso (full title Gerry Mulligan Bob Brookmeyer Play Phil Sunkel's Jazz Concerto Grosso) is an album by American jazz musicians Gerry Mulligan and Bob Brookmeyer featuring performances of compositions by Phil Sunkel recorded in 1957 and released on the ABC-Paramount label. The album was released on CD combined with the 1956 album "Every morning I Listen to... Phil Sunkel's Jazz Band".

Reception

The Allmusic review by Ken Dryden stated "Although Gerry Mulligan and Bob Brookmeyer get top billing on this LP, the leader, composer, and arranger of all three compositions is cornetist Phil Sunkel. ...All of the music is enjoyable and falls clearly into the cool jazz genre, but it has languished in obscurity like Sunkel, though he was later briefly  a member of the acclaimed Gerry Mulligan Concert Jazz Band".

Track listing
All compositions by Phil Sunkel
 "Jazz Concerto Grosso" - 15:40
 "Something for the Ladies" - 9:10
 "Song for Cornet" - 7:53

Personnel
Gerry Mulligan - baritone saxophone 
Bob Brookmeyer - valve trombone
Phil Sunkel - cornet
John Wilson - trumpet, flugelhorn
Nick Travis, Al Stewart, Don Stratton - trumpet (track 1)
Frank Rehak - trombone (track 1)
Eddie Bert - bass trombone (track 1)
Don Butterfield - tuba (track 1)
Dick Meldonian - alto saxophone (track 1)
Cliff Hoff (track 1), Bill Slapin (track 1), Jim Reider (tracks 2 & 3) - tenor saxophone
Gene Allen - baritone saxophone (track 1)
Milt Hinton (track 1), Wendell Marshall (tracks 2 & 3) - bass
Harold Granowsky (track 1), Osie Johnson (tracks 2 & 3) - drums

References

Bob Brookmeyer albums
Gerry Mulligan albums
1958 albums
Albums produced by Creed Taylor
ABC Records albums